Stefan Armbruster (born 26 March 1953) is a German coxswain who represented West Germany. He competed at the 1968 Summer Olympics in Mexico City with the men's coxed four where they came twelfth.

References

1953 births
Living people
German male rowers
Olympic rowers of West Germany
Rowers at the 1968 Summer Olympics
People from Baden-Baden
Coxswains (rowing)
Sportspeople from Karlsruhe (region)